Salim Kandi (also Romanized as Salīm Kandī; also known as Tappeh Lar) is a village in Nazluy-ye Jonubi Rural District, in the Central District of Urmia County, West Azerbaijan Province, Iran. At the 2006 census, its population was 53, in 16 families.

References 

Populated places in Urmia County